Morup is a locality situated in Falkenberg Municipality, Halland County, Sweden, with 259 inhabitants in 2010.

References 

Populated places in Halland County
Populated places in Falkenberg Municipality